Justin Crow (born 16 July 1983) is a former Australian rules footballer who played with Collingwood in the Australian Football League (AFL).

Crow was recruited from the Oakleigh Chargers of the TAC Cup, but from Doncaster originally. In 2004 he made just one AFL appearance, in Collingwood's round 19 win over Fremantle at Subiaco Oval. He took two marks and had two kicks in the win. After leaving Collingwood he continued playing football with the Northern Bullants. Despite his minimal number of games for the senior team, Crow was the first Collingwood player to twice win the Joseph Wren Memorial Trophy for the best and fairest in the VFL team.

In 2013 Justin became the acting fitness coach at Essendon Football Club.

He is the son of Max Crow, who played for Essendon, St Kilda and Footscray.

References

1983 births
Australian rules footballers from Victoria (Australia)
Collingwood Football Club players
Oakleigh Chargers players
Preston Football Club (VFA) players
Living people